Aleksandar Todorov (born July 17, 1973) is a Macedonian basketball coach. He was the  head coach of MZT Skopje, when they won the title for the first time in their history. In addition to his Macedonian citizenship, Todorov also holds Bulgarian citizenship.

Club titles
Macedonian Cup: 2 (2001, 2012)
BIBL: 1 (2009)
Macedonian First League: 1 (2012)

References

1973 births
Living people
Macedonian basketball coaches
Sportspeople from Skopje